Xenusion auerswaldae is an early lobopodian known from two specimens found in glacial erratics on the Baltic coast of Germany. They probably originated in the Kalmarsund Sandstone of Southern Sweden, which was deposited in the Lower Cambrian (Upper Tommotian–Lower Atdabanian; Stages 2→3). It is the oldest currently known lobopodian with soft body fossils.

The specimens are not especially well preserved. The older specimen is 10 cm or so in length with a narrow, weakly segmented body. Assuming it was the posterior section, the specimen was estimated to be part of an animal about 20 cm in length. A depression runs up the bottom on all but the rearmost segments. There is a slightly bulbous termination, and each segment before that seems to have a single pair of tapering annulated legs similar to the modern onychophoran, but without specialized feet and claws. More than 10 body segments were present. There is presumably a spine on each body bump and faint transverse parallel striations on the annulations on the legs. The legs of what is possibly the foremost segments are either absent or not preserved. The head is believed to be missing or is poorly preserved. Based on a new specimen that showing the anterior section, it possibly have a long narrow proboscis. but this also suggested to be a preservational artefact.

Xenusion has been reinterpreted as an Ediacaran frond animal by Tarlo, and a drawing of that interpretation has been presented by McMenamin. In a photograph presented in The Treatise on Invertebrate Paleontology Volume O, the organism's appearance seems to support the original interpretation more.  Further studies of Xenusiid close the possibility of a Rangeomorphy affinity.

References

External links
Onychophora: Fossil Record

Xenusia
Terreneuvian first appearances
Cambrian Series 2 extinctions
Cambrian genus extinctions